The boys' slalom competition of the 2020 Winter Youth Olympics was held at the Les Diablerets Alpine Centre, Switzerland, on 14 January.

Results
The race was started at 11:30 (Run 1) and 15:00 (Run 2).

References

Boys' slalom